St Paul's Anglican Church is a Category II listed heritage building in the Christchurch, New Zealand suburb of Papanui.

History
St Paul's was registered by the New Zealand Historic Places Trust on 9 December 2005 as a Category II heritage building, with registration number 7635. The current church, built in 1877, was designed by Benjamin Mountfort.

The timber church was badly damaged in the February 2011 Christchurch earthquake. After an extensive restoration process the church was reopened in September 2013.

Ernest Rutherford married his wife here in 1900.

St Paul's graveyard
The graveyard at St Paul's Church is the last resting place for numerous notable Cantabrians. The first person to be buried in the cemetery was George Dunnage (ca 1803 – 19 May 1853), who was the first vicar of St Paul's. Other notable burials include:
 William Guise Brittan (1807–1876) Commissioner of Crown Lands and a founder of the Canterbury Settlement.
 Edward Dobson (1816–1908) was the first Provincial Engineer. Amongst other achievements he engineered the Lyttelton Rail Tunnel and oversaw the erection of the stop banks and groynes to prevent the Waimakariri River from flooding Christchurch.
 Tony Foster (1853–1918) and his wife Emily Foster (1842–1897) both made a career in teaching. He was principal of Christchurch West School and later of the Christchurch Training College. She was senior woman teacher at Christchurch West and then headmistress at Christchurch Girls' High School. Emily Foster was a daughter of Guise Brittan.
 Kenneth Macfarlane Gresson (1891–1974), soldier, lawyer, university lecturer and judge
 Sir (Robert) Heaton Rhodes K.C.V.O.  K.B.E (1861–1956) Barrister, Farmer and Minister of the Crown who held the Portfolios for Public Health, Defence and was Postmaster General. He fought in the Boer Wars, travelled to Gallipoli at his own expense to ensure the New Zealand soldiers were well treated, helped establish the Nurse Maude District Nursing scheme and the Royal New Zealand Air Force, was knighted on 1920 and again in 1927 and provided land and money for philanthropic projects.
 William Thomson (1818–1866) was a 19th-century politician from Christchurch, New Zealand, originally from Scotland.  He held office at all levels of government, from Parliament and Provincial Council to chairman of a road board. In his professional life, Thomson was an auctioneer, accountant and commission agent.  He had rural holdings in Governors Bay and at the Esk River.
 Captain Charles Upham (1908–1994) V.C and Bar, was a farmer who in World War II became a New Zealand hero by winning two Victoria Crosses for bravery. The first was won in Crete in May 1941 and the second in July 1942 at Ruweisat Ridge near El Alamein in Egypt.

Notes

References

External links
 

Heritage New Zealand Category 2 historic places in Canterbury, New Zealand
Anglican churches in New Zealand
Benjamin Mountfort church buildings
Listed churches in New Zealand
1870s architecture in New Zealand
Cemeteries in Christchurch